John 1:8 is the eighth verse in the first chapter of the Gospel of John in the New Testament of the Christian Bible.

Content
In the original Greek according to Westcott-Hort this verse is:
Οὐκ ἦν ἐκεῖνος τὸ φῶς, ἀλλ᾿ ἵνα μαρτυρήσῃ περὶ τοῦ φωτός.  

In the King James Version of the Bible the text reads:
He was not that Light, but was sent to bear witness of that Light.

The New International Version translates the passage as:
He himself was not the light; he came only as a witness to the light.

Analysis
According to Witham "He" refers to John, that he was not the true light, since the word was the light, which is expressed as the true light, to bar anyone from thinking that John the Baptist was the light.

Commentary from the Church Fathers
Chrysostom: "Forasmuch however as with us, the one who witnesses, is commonly a more important, a more trustworthy person, than the one to whom he bears witness, to do away with any such notion in the present case the Evangelist proceeds; He was not that Light, but was sent to bear witness of that Light. If this were not his intention, in repeating the words, to bear witness of the Light, the addition would be superfluous, and rather a verbal repetition, than the explanation of a truth."

Theophylact of Ohrid: " But it will be said, that we do not allow John or any of the saints to be or ever to have been light. The difference is this: If we call any of the saints light, we put light without the article. So if asked whether John is light, without the article, thou mayest allow without hesitation that he is: if with the article, thou allow it not. For he is not very, original, light, but is only called so, on account of his partaking of the light, which cometh from the true Light."

References

External links
Other translations of John 1:8 at BibleHub

01:8
Light and religion